John James Blacklaw Borthwick (15 February 1886 – 23 April 1942) was a Scottish professional footballer who played as a centre half in the Football League for Everton. He also played in the Scottish League for Hibernian.

Personal life 
Borthwick's younger brother Watty also became a footballer and his son Bill worked as a trainer for Everton. Borthwick served as a private in the Football Battalion of the Middlesex Regiment during the First World War and suffered a gunshot wound to the head at Delville Wood in 1916. He described his injuries in a letter to Bert Lipsham: "my head has been trepanned, as the skull was knocked in. The cut extends from nearly the top of my head down to my eyebrow. It was a near thing of losing my right eye". Borthwick was discharged on 12 April 1917. After his retirement from football, he ran the Winslow Hotel, opposite Goodison Park.

Career statistics

References

Scottish footballers
English Football League players
Association football midfielders
Lochgelly United F.C. players
Hibernian F.C. players
1886 births
People from Leith
British Army personnel of World War I
Middlesex Regiment soldiers
Everton F.C. players
Millwall F.C. players
Southern Football League players
East Fife F.C. players
Cowdenbeath F.C. players
1942 deaths
Date of death missing
Scottish Football League players
Footballers from Edinburgh